Acremodonta crassicosta is a species of minute, deep-water sea snail, a marine gastropod mollusc or micromollusk in the family Ataphridae, the false top snails or false top shells.

Distribution
This species is endemic to the deeper waters around New Zealand's Three Kings Islands.

References

 Powell A. W. B., New Zealand Mollusca, William Collins Publishers Ltd, Auckland, New Zealand 1979 
 Marshall, B.A. 1983: Acremodontinae: a new subfamily of the Trochidae (Mollusca: Gastropoda). National Museum of New Zealand Records 2: 127-130 (p. 127)

Ataphridae
Gastropods of New Zealand
Gastropods described in 1937
Taxa named by Arthur William Baden Powell
Endemic fauna of New Zealand
Endemic molluscs of New Zealand